The Gild Fryske Mounders is an association of volunteer millers operating windmills in the Dutch province Friesland. Its goal is to preserve and spread miller knowledge and skills to ensure the availability of enough millers who can responsibly operate all functional windmills in Frisia.
For this purpose it offers a volunteer miller training program. Furthermore, it organises the Frisian mills day, excursions and together with De Fryske Mole publishes a quarterly magazine De Utskoat .

History 
The Gild Fryske Mounders (Frisian Guild) was founded in 1975 when it broke away from the Gilde van Vrijwillige Molenaars, mostly out of discontent with the education and exam procedures of the Gilde van Vrijwillige Molenaars (Dutch Guild) and the exam committee of De Hollandsche Molen. 
After some years of internal turmoil and discussion with the Dutch Guild it became clear that consensus could not be reached and the Frisian Guild existed independently with its own training program and exam. The number of members gradually increased from 30 at the start to 150 in 1994 though with a constant worry about the low number of millers in training. In 1998 a merger was attempted between the two volunteer miller guilds. The Frisian Guild merged with the Frisian branch of the Dutch Guild and all Frisian diplomas were converted to Dutch certificates. In the end disagreement about the contents of education program and the exam procedures turned out to be too great and in 2003 the Frisian Guild became independent again.

Volunteer miller training 
On average half a day per week prospective millers are taught the theory and practice of operating a windmill by a miller at an appointed training mill. The training takes at least one and a half years (though often longer) so the apprentice miller experiences all types of weather common in the Netherlands. The examination committee consists of the teaching miller and two independent experienced millers. 
The volunteer miller certificates of the Frisian and Dutch guilds are not officially recognised. There are plenty of active millers without a certificate, however mill organisations do often require it.

See also 
 Gilde van Vrijwillige Molenaars
 Stichting De Fryske Mole
 De Hollandsche Molen

External links 
Molenaar worden, website Gild Fryske Mounders
De Utskoat

References 

Guilds in the Netherlands
Windmills in Friesland